The Italy women's national under-18 ice hockey team is the women's national under-18 ice hockey team of Italy. The team is controlled by the Federazione Italiana Sport del Ghiaccio, a member of the International Ice Hockey Federation.

Women's World U18 Championship record
The Italy women's national under-18 ice hockey team played its first game in 2011 against Kazakhstan during the 2012 IIHF World Women's U18 Championship Division I Qualification being held in Asiago, Italy. Italy won the game 12-0 which would also be recorded as their largest win in international participation. Italy finished the tournament in fourth place, after managing only two wins out of their five games, and failed to qualify for the upcoming 2012 Division I tournament. During the tournament they suffered a 0–6 defeat against Hungary which is to date their largest loss in international competition.

Team

Current roster
Roster for the 2023 IIHF World Women's U18 Championship Division I Group A.

Head coach: Massimo FedrizziAssistant coaches: Luca Giacomuzzi, Denis Bruera (goaltender)

References

External links
Sports Federation Website 

under 18
Women's national under-18 ice hockey teams